Édouard Nicolas Henri Charles Close (8 July 1929 – 2 March 2017) was a Belgian politician and member of the former Socialist Party (PSB). He served as the Mayor of Liège, one of Belgium's largest cities, for thirteen years from 1976 to 1990. Close had also served as the interior minister of Belgium during the first government of Prime Minister Edmond Leburton from 26 January 1973 until 23 April 1974.

Close died on 2 March 2017 at the age of 87.

References

1929 births
2017 deaths
Mayors of Liège
Interior ministers of Belgium
Socialist Party (Belgium) politicians
Belgian Socialist Party politicians